Islamganthi Mosque, also spelt Islamganti Mosque, is a medieval three-domed Islamic place of worship in northern Bangladesh's Naogaon District. The seventeenth-century mosque dates back to the Mughal period.

Location
The mosque is located in the village of Islamganthi, in Bisha Union, Atrai Upazila, Naogaon District. It lies on the banks of the Atrai River.

History
Although the history of this mosque is shrouded in history, locals believe that it was constructed over 500 years ago within the span of a single night. Researchers have hypothesised that the mosque was constructed by Islam Khan I during his term as the Mughal Subahdar of Bengal which lasted between 1608 and 1613. Many villages in the area are named after the governor.

Description
The mosque has three circular domes which lie on top of the mosque's three rooms respectively.

References

Naogaon District
17th-century mosques
Mughal mosques
Historic sites in Bangladesh